Gorillaz Live was the first concert tour by the British alternative rock virtual band Gorillaz, in support of their self-titled debut album.

Personnel
Damon Albarn – lead vocals, keyboards, rhythm guitar, piano, acoustic guitar, melodica
Junior Dan – bass guitar
Roberto Occhipinti – bass guitar (only during North American tour, replacing Junior Dan)
Simon Katz – lead guitar
Cass Browne – drums, percussion, drum machine
Mike Smith – keyboards
Darren Galea "DJ D-Zire" – turntables
Phi Life Cypher – vocals on "Clint Eastwood" and "Rock the House" (Non-North American tour dates)
Jamal Gray – vocals on "Clint Eastwood" and "Rock the House" (only during North American tour)
D12 – vocals on "911" (New York City only)
Sweetie Irie – vocals on "Clint Eastwood (Ed Case Refix)"
Haruka Kuroda – backing vocals, speaking voice of Noodle (miming playing the second guitar to look like Noodle with the helmet; intermissions)
Remi Kabaka Jr. – speaking voice of Russel (intermissions)
Phil Cornwell – speaking voice of Murdoc (intermissions)
Nelson De Freitas – speaking voice of 2-D (intermissions)

Opening acts
Dan Nakamura (select dates)

Visuals and production
The logistics of an animated band going on tour proved problematic, with Jamie Hewlett saying in a mid-2001 interview: "We've come to realize that we've come up with something that's a bit ahead of its time and the technology doesn't exist to do everything we want to do, so the live show was something we had to really think hard about." As a compromise between having a live and virtual stage presence, the band's musicians played behind a giant cinema screen, which projected music videos and visuals to the crowd. Lead singer Damon Albarn later expressed discomfort at this setup, confessing that he "was frustrated" behind the screen. Later still, Albarn called the screens "obtuse", believing the human element of the band necessitated a change. In a 2010 interview, Albarn voiced distaste at the concept of hiding collaborators behind a screen on the then-upcoming Escape to Plastic Beach Tour: "I couldn't entertain the idea of putting Lou Reed or Bobby Womack behind a screen. I'm not that daft." Gorillaz Live was ultimately the only tour to have the musicians silhouetted behind a screen.

The voice actors of the virtual band toured alongside the real band, speaking to the crowd and each other in-between songs. However, according to Haruka Kuroda, budgeting issues prevented most of the voice actors from participating in the concert's international legs; Kuroda was the only voice actor to tour with the band beyond Europe.

Set list
The following setlist is obtained from the concert held in London on 22 March 2001. It is not a representation of all shows on the tour.

 "M1 A1"
 "Tomorrow Comes Today"
 "Slow Country"
 "5/4"
 "Starshine"
 "Man Research (Clapper)"
 "Sound Check (Gravity)"
 "Latin Simone (¿Qué Pasa Contigo?)"
 "Re-Hash"
 "Clint Eastwood" (featuring Phi Life Cypher)
 "Rock the House" (featuring Phi Life Cypher)
 "Dracula"
 "19-2000"
 "Punk"
Encore
 "Clint Eastwood" (featuring Sweetie Irie)

Tour dates

Notes

References

Gorillaz concert tours
2001 concert tours
2002 concert tours